Blue Hill is a census-designated place (CDP) in the town of Blue Hill in Hancock County, Maine, United States. The CDP population was 943 at the 2010 census, out of a population of 2,686 in the town of Blue Hill as a whole.

Geography
The Blue Hill CDP consists of the main village within the town of Blue Hill. The CDP is located at the geographic center of the town, surrounding the head of Blue Hill Harbor, an arm of Blue Hill Bay. The CDP extends south along Route 175 as far as Bragdon Brook, just north of Blue Hill Falls; southwest along Routes 15 and 176 as far as Grindleville Road; west along Route 177 (Union Street) to Field House Lane; northwest along Route 15 past Mountain Road to the southern slopes of Blue Hill; northeast along Route 172 past Mountain Road; and east along Route 176 to Peters Cove and Little Peters Brook. The  summit of Blue Hill is just outside the CDP to the north.

Demographics

References

Census-designated places in Maine
Census-designated places in Hancock County, Maine